The  is a river flowing through the town of Shimizu in the Suntō District, Shizuoka Prefecture, Japan.

The Kakita River is a tributary of the Kano River. At only , it is the shortest Class 1 River in Japan.

Most of the river's source water comes from springs created by rainfall and melting snow on Mount Fuji. Therefore, the temperature of the river is around 15 °C throughout the year. The river is also known as the only habitat of Mishima-baikamo (ja:ミシマバイカモ). The area around the springs is protected as a park ( by the Shimizu town government.

Also, famous for being a clear-flowing river, the Kakita River has been named one of the "Three Clear-Flowing Rivers in Japan", along with the Nagara River in Gifu Prefecture and the Shimanto River in Kōchi Prefecture.

References

External links

 (flow into Kano River)
 Information Kanogawa - Ministry of Land, Infrastructure and Transport NUMAZU Office.
 Kakita River webcam - showing underwater spring.

Rivers of Shizuoka Prefecture
Rivers of Japan